Jonathan Eysseric and Quentin Halys were the defending champions but chose not to defend their title.

Ivan Liutarevich and Vladyslav Manafov won the title after defeating Karol Drzewiecki and Kacper Żuk 7–6(12–10), 7–6(9–7) in the final.

Seeds

Draw

References

External links
 Main draw

Challenger La Manche - Doubles
2023 Doubles